Swarnalatha
(29 April 1973 – 12 September 2010) was an Indian playback singer. She recorded over 10,000 songs in 10 Indian languages including Tamil, Telugu, Malayalam, Kannada, Hindi, Bengali and other languages. 
   
Swarnalatha's career began with the film Neethikku Thandanai (1987) which had music by M. S. Viswanathan. There after, she recorded many hundreds of songs for composers such as Ilaiyaraaja, A. R. Rahman, Mani Sharma, Koti, Deva, Vidyasagar, Hamsalekha and others. She received the National Film Award for Best Female Playback Singer for the song "Poraale Ponnuthayi" from the film Karuthamma (1994). She has sung more than 300 songs for Ilaiyaraaja and more than 100 songs for Vandemataram Srinivas. 

This is only a partial list. Swarnalatha has sung over 10,000 songs in Tamil, Kannada, Telugu, Hindi, Malayalam, Urdu, Bengali, Oriya, Punjabi and Badaga.

Tamil film songs

1980s

1990s

2000s

Telugu film songs

1990s

2000s

Malayalam film songs

Kannada film songs

Hindi film songs

Serial songs

References

Lists of songs recorded by Indian singers